Cytharopsis is a genus of sea snails, marine gastropod mollusks in the family Mangeliidae.

Not to be confused with Citharopsis Pease, 1868, a synonym of Anarithma Iredale, 1916 (family Mitromorphidae).

Description
The fusiform shell is acuminate. The convex whorls of the spire are cancellated with longitudinal ribs and transverse lirae. The aperture is narrow. The outer lip is varicose. The columella is sillonated. The siphonal canal is curved to the left and elongated.

Species
Species within the genus Cytharopsis include:
 Cytharopsis butonensis (Schepman, 1913)
 Cytharopsis cancellata A. Adams, 1865
 Cytharopsis exquisita (E. A. Smith, 1882)
 Cytharopsis kyushuensis T. Shuto, 1965
 Cytharopsis radulina Kuroda & Oyama, 1971
Species brought into synonymy
 Cytharopsis gracilis Pease, 1868: synonym of Seminella peasei (Martens & Langkavel, 1871)
 Cytharopsis ornata Pease, 1868: synonym of Zafra ornata (Pease, 1868)
 Cytharopsis solida (L.A. Reeve, 1846) : synonym of Eucithara solida (L.A. Reeve, 1846)

References

External links
  Tucker, J.K. 2004 Catalog of recent and fossil turrids (Mollusca: Gastropoda). Zootaxa 682:1-1295.
 Worldwide Mollusc Species Data Base: Mangeliidae
 Bouchet, P.; Kantor, Y. I.; Sysoev, A.; Puillandre, N. (2011). A new operational classification of the Conoidea. Journal of Molluscan Studies. 77, 273-308

 
Gastropod genera